The 2005 ICC Africa/East Asia-Pacific Under-19 Championship was a cricket tournament held in South Africa from 21–26 August 2005, during the 2005 international season. All matches were held at the Willowmoore Park complex in Benoni, Gauteng.

Namibia won the tournament by defeating Uganda in the final, with both teams qualifying for the 2006 Under-19 World Cup in Sri Lanka. Tanzanian batsman Benson Mwita led the competition in runs scored, while Kenya's Rohit Vekaria took the most wickets. Ugandan all-rounder Ronald Ssemanda was Player of the Final.

The tournament was jointly organised by the African Cricket Association (ACA) and ICC East Asia-Pacific (EAP), with eight teams (six African and two EAP) participating, divided into two pools for the group stages. Another joint tournament had been held in 2003, for the 2004 World Cup, but separate qualifying tournaments have been held since – the ICC Africa Under-19 Championships and the EAP Under-19 Cricket Trophy.

Teams and qualification 
Teams were unchanged from the 2003 tournament in Namibia:

Preparation

Group stage

Pool A

Pool B

Finals

7th-place playoff

5th-place playoff
Two semi-finals were held for the 5th-place playoff, with Zambia defeating Fiji by four wickets and Tanzania defeating Nigeria by eight wickets. The losing teams played each other in the 7th-place playoff.

3rd-place playoff

Final
Two semi-finals were held, with Uganda defeating Kenya by two wickets and Namibia defeating Papua New Guinea by 100 runs. The losing teams played each other in the 3rd-place playoff.

Statistics

Most runs
The top five runscorers are included in this table, ranked by runs scored and then by batting average.

Source: CricketArchive

Most wickets

The top five wicket takers are listed in this table, ranked by wickets taken and then by bowling average.

Source: CricketArchive

References 

Under-19 regional cricket tournaments
Cricket in Gauteng
International cricket competitions in 2005
2005 in South African cricket
International cricket competitions in South Africa